Dirk Ulaszewski (born March 18, 1964 in Essen) is a West German sprint canoer who competed in the late 1980s. At the 1988 Summer Olympics in Seoul, he was eliminated in the semifinals of the K-1 1000 m event.

References
 Sports-Reference.com profile

1964 births
Canoeists at the 1988 Summer Olympics
German male canoeists
Living people
Olympic canoeists of West Germany
Sportspeople from Essen